Odus is a genus of robber flies in the family Asilidae. There is at least one described species in Odus, O. fragilis.

References

Further reading

External links

 
 

Asilidae
Asilidae genera